Amanitakaye was a Nubian royal woman, so far only known from her burial in the royal cemetery of Nuri (Nuri 26). She was perhaps the mother of king Malonaqen, but this is only a guess, although supported by objects with that king's name in her burial.  Without much evidence it was proposed that she was the daughter of Aspelta and sister-wife of Aramatle-qo.

She bears the titles king's mother and king's sister. 

Amanitakaye's burial consisted of a pyramid with a chapel and the underground burial rooms. In the chapel there was still standing a stela. There was a staircase going underground and leading to the two burial chambers. The burial was found robbed, but fragments of at least 89  shabtis were found. They bear the name and the title of the queen. Several vessels were found too. There were further on faience plaques with her name and with the name of king Malonaqen. This might indicate that she was his mother. Another object with her name is an electrum cylinder. On this cylinder she bears the title king's sister too.

References 

6th-century BC women
Queens of Kush